Lorymana is a monotypic snout moth genus described by Embrik Strand in 1915. Its single species, Lorymana noctuiformis, was described in the same article and is found in Sudan.

References

Endemic fauna of Sudan
Pyralinae
Monotypic moth genera
Moths of Africa
Pyralidae genera